Shahdag National Park — is a national park of Azerbaijan.

It is located in northern Azerbaijan, close to the border with Russia at the Greater Caucasus Mountains. 
Mount Bazardüzü, the highest mountain of Azerbaijan is located in Shadag National Park.
The Shahdag National Park is the largest national park not only Azerbaijan but in the whole Caucasus.

The World Bank has allocated a $17 million loan and $8 million grant for the national park's creation, while the government of Japan has provided $8 million as a grant for the project implementation. The Shahdag National Park will help address ecological issues and build a tourist infrastructure in the Caucasus for visitors.

Flora and fauna

Flora

The major types of trees are Caucasian Oak (Quercus macranthera), Caucasian Ash (Fraxinus angustifolia subsp. oxycarpa), European Hornbeam (Carpinus betulus), Oriental Hornbeam (Carpinus orientalis), Oriental Beech (Fagus orientalis), Silver Birch (Betula pendula), White Birch (Betula pubescens), Common Yew (Taxus baccata), White Willow (Salix alba), Common Walnut (Juglans regia), Wild Cherry (Prunus avium), Caucasian Pear (Pyrus communis  subsp. caucasica), etc.

Shrub species occurring in the area include Various-Leaved Hawthorn (Crataegus heterophylla), Dog Rose (Rosa canina), Blackberry (Rubus fruticosus), Common Medlar (Mespilus germanica), European Barberry (Berberis vulgaris), etc.

Fauna

The national park is home to the rare East Caucasian tur (Capra cylindricornis), a mountain dwelling goat antelope found only in the eastern half of the Caucasus Mountains. Other large mammals found here are the Caucasian chamois (Rupicapra rupicapra subsp. caucasica), Bezoar ibex (Capra aegagrus aegagrus), domestic goat (Capra aegagrus hircus), Caucasian lynx (Lynx lynx dinniki), Syrian brown bear (Ursus arctos syriacus), wild boar (Sus scrofa), Indian wolf (Canis lupus pallipes), common jackal (Canis aureus aureus), common jungle cat (Felis chaus chaus), red fox (Vulpes vulpes), roe deer (Capreolus capreolus), badger (Meles meles), and otter (Lutra lutra), etc.

Reintroduction has been launched of the European bison, or wizent (a widely-used Polish name for 'bison'), which were formerly extirpated from  Azerbaijan. Reintroduction in the 1960s and 1970s was initially unsuccessful, as by 1977, all the reintroduced animals had perished. It was thought that the bison had consumed poisonous yew shoots and leaves, and subsequently died.

See also
 Nature of Azerbaijan
 National Parks of Azerbaijan
 State Reserves of Azerbaijan
 List of protected areas of Azerbaijan

References

External links

 Shakhdag National Park Official Website - Ministry of Ecology and Natural Resources of Azerbaijan 
 National Parks: Shakhdag National Park - Ministry of Ecology and Natural Resources of Azerbaijan 

IUCN Category II
National parks of Azerbaijan
Forests of Azerbaijan
Protected areas established in 2006
2006 establishments in Azerbaijan